Hibachi for Lunch is a third extended play (EP) by American rapper 2 Chainz.  It was self-released on October 28, 2016. The project consists of seven tracks, with guest appearances from Quavo, Ty Dolla Sign, Gucci Mane and Future, with production from Buddah Bless, DJ Paul, FKi 1st, Foreign Teck, K Swisha, Mike Dean, Mike Will Made It, Mondo, Supah Mario and TWhy Xclusive.

Originally the third track on the tape, "Good Drank" was removed from the tracklist and released January 20, 2017, as the lead single from his fourth studio album Pretty Girls Like Trap Music.

Track listing

References

2016 EPs
2 Chainz albums
Albums produced by DJ Paul
Albums produced by FKi (production team)
Albums produced by Mike Dean (record producer)
Albums produced by Mike Will Made It